Joseph Holbrooke's Horn Trio in D minor, Op. 28, is a chamber composition for a trio consisting of horn, violin and piano. Conceived as a companion piece to Brahms's Horn Trio Op. 40, the work was composed no earlier than 1904 and revised by the composer between 1906 and 1912.

Structure

The composition is structured in three movements:
 Larghetto sostenuto – Allegro con brio
 Adagio non troppo
 Rondo: Molto vivace

A typical performance takes around 27 to 30 minutes.

References
Notes

Sources

External links

 - Reviews of the Naxos recording, with additional notes by the author of the liner notes to the Naxos Album.

Compositions by Joseph Holbrooke
Holbrooke
Holbrooke
1904 compositions
Holbrooke